John Mitchell Wilson (February 15, 1962 – May 18, 2019) was a Canadian ice hockey centre. Wilson played in the National Hockey League (NHL) for the New Jersey Devils and Pittsburgh Penguins, making his NHL debut on October 12, 1984. In August 2014, he was diagnosed with Amyotrophic lateral sclerosis, and he died from the disease in 2019.

References

External links

1962 births
2019 deaths
Canadian ice hockey centres
Ice hockey people from British Columbia
New Jersey Devils players
Pittsburgh Penguins players
Seattle Breakers players
Sportspeople from Kelowna
Undrafted National Hockey League players
Neurological disease deaths in Washington (state)
Deaths from motor neuron disease